Conchapelopia is a genus of flies belonging to the family Chironomidae (the non-biting midges).

Species

Species include:

Eurasian species

C. aagardi Murray, 1987 - Britain, Germany, Norway
C. abiskoensis Goetghebuer, 1940 - Finland, Sweden
C. flavifrons (Johannsen, 1905)
C. garim Na & Bae, 2010 - Korea
C. hittmairorum Michiels & Spies, 2002 - Europe, North Africa
C. intermedia Fittkau, 1962 - Scandinavia, Germany
C. melanops (Meigen, 1818) - Palaearctic, North Africa, Near East
C. pallidula Meigen, 1818 - Europe, Near East
C. seoulpia Na & Bae, 2010 - Korea
C. triannulata (Goetghebuer, 1921) - Europe, Near East
C. viator (Kieffer, 1911) - Palaearctic, North Africa

Nearctic species

C. aleta Roback, 1971
C. bruna Roback, 1971
C. currani Walley, 1925
C. fasciata Beck and Beck, 1966
C. mera Roback, 1971
C. pallens (Coquillett, 1902)
C. paramelanops Roback, 1971
C. rurika Roback, 1957
C. telema Roback, 1971
C. varna Roback, 1981

African species
C. cygnus (Kieffer, 1923)
C. trifascia (Freeman, 1954)

References

Fauna Europaea
Nomina Insecta Nearctica

Tanypodinae